The Douglas XB-31 (Douglas Model 332) was the design submitted by Douglas after the request by the United States Army Air Forces for a very heavy bomber aircraft, the same request that led to the Boeing B-29 Superfortress, Lockheed XB-30, and Consolidated B-32 Dominator.

Design and development
Around 1938, United States Army General Henry H. "Hap" Arnold, the head of the US Army Air Corps (USAAC), was growing alarmed at the possibility of war in Europe and in the Pacific. Hoping to be prepared for the long-term requirements of the Air Force, Arnold created a special committee chaired by Brigadier General W. G. Kilner; one of its members was Charles Lindbergh. The Douglas firm at the time was working on an even larger, 212 foot (64.6 meter) wingspan four-engined strategic bomber prototype airframe, the Douglas XB-19, that made her maiden flight in late June 1941.   

After a tour of Luftwaffe bases, Lindbergh became convinced that Nazi Germany was far ahead of other European nations. In a report in 1939, the committee made a number of recommendations, including development of new long-range heavy bombers. When war broke out in Europe, Arnold requested design studies from several companies on a Very Long-Range bomber capable of travelling 5,000 miles (8,000 km). Approval was granted on 2 December 1939.

Throughout 1939 and 1940 Douglas investigated designs of the Model 332 with different powerplants (Wright R-2600, Pratt and Whitney R-2800, Wright R-2160, Wright R-3350). All were designed to have roughly same operating range, with variations in the projected service ceiling.

The XB-31 design was rejected in favor of the B-29 and B-32 (along with the XB-30) because the USAAC found the B-29 superior to the Douglas and Lockheed designs.

Specifications (Model 332F as designed)

See also

References

Citations

Bibliography

 Francillon, René J. McDonnell Douglas Aircraft since 1920. London: Putnam & Company Ltd., 1979. .
 Jones, Lloyd S. U.S. Bombers: B-1 1928 to B-1 1980s. Fallbrook, California: Aero Publishers, Inc., 1974. .

External links

Cancelled military aircraft projects of the United States
B-31
B-31, Douglas
High-wing aircraft
Four-engined piston aircraft